Seal Rocks comprises two small islets – Seal Rock and Black Rock –  south-west of Phillip Island in Victoria, Australia at the western entrance to Western Port.

Flora & fauna 
The islands are a major Australian Fur Seal colony.  Approximately 5000 pups are born on Seal Rocks each year – 25% of the Australian population.

References

Islands of Victoria (Australia)
Western Port
Uninhabited islands of Australia